The discography of Kenny Loggins. See also the Loggins and Messina discography.

Studio albums

Live albums

Compilation albums

Singles

Video albums

Music videos

Other appearances

Notes

A^ Return to Pooh Corner also reached No. 7 on the U.S. Billboard Top Kids Audio chart.

References

Pop music discographies
Discographies of American artists
Discography